The Twenty-seventh Oklahoma Legislature was a meeting of the legislative branch of the government of Oklahoma, composed of the Oklahoma Senate and the Oklahoma House of Representatives. The state legislature met in regular session at the Oklahoma State Capitol in Oklahoma City from January 6 to July 3, 1959, during the term of Governor J. Howard Edmondson.

Dates of session
January 6 to July 3, 1959
Previous: 26th Legislature • Next: 28th Legislature

Leadership

Democratic leadership
President Pro Tem of the Senate: Everett Boecher
Speaker of the House: Clint Livingston
Speaker Pro Tempore: Noble Stewart
Majority Floor Leader: Frank Ogden

Republican leadership
Minority Leader: Denzil Garrison

Members

Senate

Table based on 2005 Oklahoma Almanac.

House of Representatives

Table based on database of historic members.

Staff
Louise Stockton

References

Oklahoma legislative sessions
1959 in Oklahoma
1960 in Oklahoma
1959 U.S. legislative sessions
1960 U.S. legislative sessions